Brad Pattelli is a former vice president of Angelo, Gordon & Co, an arbitrage firm headquartered in New York City, New York.  He most recently served as President of LC Advisors, a subsidiary of Lending Club, an online platform for investing in personal loans.

Pattelli was the managing director on several of Angelo, Gordon & Co.'s investments in the largest newspaper bankruptcies across the country. He headed Angelo, Gordon & Co.'s efforts into becoming one of the main secured creditors in the bankruptcies of the Tribune Co., parent company of the Los Angeles Times and Chicago Tribune; Minneapolis' Star Tribune; as well as Philadelphia Newspapers L.L.C., parent company of The Philadelphia Inquirer and the Philadelphia Daily News.

Early life and education
Pattelli holds a bachelor's degree from the University of Notre Dame and earned an M.B.A. degree from Columbia Business School.  Brad grew up in Hennepin County, Illinois; his father was a steelworker at the local rolling mill.

Career
Pattelli has formerly served on the board of directors for Dade Behring Holdings, and Thermadyne Holdings Corporation. He is currently on the board of directors for American Media Operations, Inc., a major publisher of supermarket tabloids in the United States.

References

Year of birth missing (living people)
Living people
Columbia Business School alumni
American hedge fund managers
University of Notre Dame alumni